G. concinna may refer to:

 Gagrella concinna, a joint-legged animal
 Gavia concinna, an extinct loon
 Gemmula concinna, a sea snail
 Gentianella concinna, a flowering plant
 Geonoma concinna, a New World palm
 Glossopsitta concinna, an Australian lorikeet
 Goodenia concinna, a flowering plant
 Goplana concinna, a rust fungus
 Grevillea concinna, a Western Australian shrub
 Griffinia concinna, a monocotyledonous plant
 Guignardia concinna, a sac fungus
 Gymnoscelis concinna, a geometer moth